The Major League Soccer SuperDraft's first overall pick is the player who is selected first among all eligible draftees by a team during the annual Major League Soccer (MLS) SuperDraft. The first pick is awarded to the club with the poorest regular season record during the previous MLS campaign. Exceptions are when there is an expansion franchise, where the expansion side has the opportunity to select the first overall draft pick. 

Two first picks have won the MLS Rookie of the Year award in their maiden season: Maurice Edu and Cyle Larin. 

No first pick has ever won the Landon Donovan MVP Award, although Alecko Eskandarian is the only first draft pick to win the MLS Cup Most Valuable Player Award. 

Note that between 1996 and 1999, the MLS draft was known as the MLS College Draft. Official MLS publications include the College Draft as part of MLS's draft history.

Key

List of first overall picks

Notes

See also 
 MLS SuperDraft
 MLS College Draft
 List of first overall NASL draft picks

References 

Major League Soccer drafts
Draft
Association football player non-biographical articles